Jordan Riki (born 18 January 2000) is a New Zealand rugby league footballer who plays as a  forward for the Brisbane Broncos  in the NRL.

Career

2020
Prior to the season, Riki represented the Maori All Stars in their 30-16 victory over the Indigenous All Stars. Riki made his first grade debut in round 14 of the 2020 NRL season for Brisbane against the Canberra Raiders.

Jordan Riki scored his first career try in round 17 of the 2020 NRL season running 40m dummying Panthers fullback Dylan Edwards during a loss against the Penrith Panthers. After the match, Broncos head coach Peter Gentle told the reporters that Riki could be the long term replacement at Red Hill for the outgoing star forward David Fifita.

Riki made five appearances for Brisbane in his debut season as Brisbane finished last on the table and claimed their first wooden spoon.

2021
Riki represented the Maori All Stars in a 10 all draw against the Indigenous All Stars, scoring the first try of the game in the 49th minute. On 23 March, Riki re-signed with the Brisbane Broncos on a three-year deal till the end of 2024. In round 10 of the 2021 NRL season, Riki was sent to the sin bin during Brisbane's 50-6 loss against Manly-Warringah.  Riki was also placed on report for a crusher tackle incident during the game.
In Round 20 of the 2021 NRL season, Riki played his best game in his career so far in Brisbane's 37-18 win over arch rivals North Queensland Cowboys. Riki scored a try, set up a try for Brodie Croft and made five tackle breaks in the win.

2022
Riki played a total of 22 games for Brisbane in the 2022 NRL season scoring four tries. Brisbane would finish the season in 9th place on the table.

Controversy
In September 2021, Riki was involved in a fight with teammate Thomas Flegler after a night out during Brisbane's mad monday celebrations.  It was reported that Riki received a cut on his face over the incident.

References

External links
Brisbane Broncos profile

2000 births
Living people
Brisbane Broncos players
New Zealand rugby league players
New Zealand Māori rugby league players
New Zealand Māori rugby league team players
Rugby league players from Waikato
People from Raglan, New Zealand
Rugby league second-rows